Taurinellushka babugana is a species of small, air-breathing land snail, a terrestrial pulmonate gastropod mollusk in the family Pristilomatidae.

Distribution 
This species is endemic to  the central part of the Crimean Mountains.

References

Pristilomatidae
Gastropods described in 2014
Endemic fauna of Crimea
Taxa named by Igor Balashov